Heist is a 2021 American Netflix true crime documentary series that follows the story of three heists, each told through first-hand interviews and reenactments by the people who performed them. The series was released on July 14, 2021.

The "Bourbon King" portion of the series features the actual real-life, key characters including Toby Curtsinger, Sheriff Pat Melton, and Bourbon journalist and expert Tom Fischer.

Reception 
The series received an 88% approval rating on the review aggregator site Rotten Tomatoes.

References

External links 
 
 

2021 American television series debuts
2021 American television seasons
2020s American documentary television series
English-language Netflix original programming
Netflix original documentary television series
Television series based on actual events
Documentary television series about crime in the United States